Shireen Mirza (2 August) is an Indian actress. Shireen is well known and popular for her role as Simran "Simmi" Bhalla Khurana in Ye Hai Mohabbatein. Shireen has also worked in a Web series called Dharamkshetra, on Netflix. Dhhai Kilo Prem, 24 and films like Main Nahin Anna, Not Today and Vartamaan.

Biography
Shireen hails from Jaipur.  Shireen who graduated from Maharani College, Jaipur and majored English and Dramatics. She has hosted the kids reality show Apka Sapna Hamara Apna with Ali Asgar.

Shireen married on 23 October in her hometown Jaipur.

Television
 2022 Pyar Ke Saat Vachan Dharampatnii as Mandeep Amardeep Randhawa
 2022 Bohot Pyaar Karte Hai as Kamna Pankaj Malhotra
 2013-2019 Ye Hai Mohabbatein as Simran "Simmi" Bhalla Khurana
2017 Dhhai Kilo Prem as Rashmi
Dharamkshetra on Netflix 
24
2013 Yeh Hai Aashiqui
Anhoniyon Ka Andhera
Gutur Gu
Apka Sapna Humara Apna as a Host
Savdhaan India
Box Cricket League as Herself
Yeh Kahan Aa Gaye Hum as Dr. Shireen
Not Today Hollywood Venture as a Main Negative Lead
2010 MTV Girl's Night Out as Herself (contestant)

Filmography
Main Nahin Anna
Not Today and
Vartamaan
Love Training

References

External links

 

21st-century Indian actresses
Actresses in Hindi cinema
Actresses in Hindi television
Indian film actresses
Indian television actresses
Living people
Year of birth missing (living people)